Second Round's on Me is the second studio album by rapper Obie Trice and is his final album released under Shady Records. The track "Wanna Know" can be heard on the HBO series Entourage in the episode "The Sundance Kids" and also in the game Fight Night: Round 3 for the Xbox 360 as well as the PS3. The album contains a predominance of guest appearances from members of his Detroit crew Trife Life. It was released on August 15, 2006, after over a year of delays.

Background
The first single released from the album was "Snitch" featuring Akon, with a music video directed by Jessy Terrero. Both performers can be seen and heard on the CBS series CSI: Crime Scene Investigation in the episode "Poppin' Tags" performing the hit song, and the music video can now be watched on Yahoo Music. The second single is "Cry Now" and the remix with Kuniva, Bobby Creekwater, Ca$his and Stat Quo can be found on the Eminem Presents: The Re-Up album. The third single is "Jamaican Girl".
The Album features artists such as Eminem, 50 Cent, Akon, Trey Songz, Brick & Lace, Trick Trick, Big Herk and Nate Dogg.

Reception

Commercial
The album debuted at number eight on the Billboard 200 with 74,000 copies sold in its first week. As of January 2016, the album has sold 240,000 units.

Critical

Second Round's on Me received mixed reviews from music critics. At Metacritic, which assigns a normalized rating out of 100 to reviews from mainstream critics, the album received an average score of 48, based on 9 reviews, indicating "mixed or average reviews".

J-23 of HipHopDX gave high praise to Trice for having more of a presence on his own record to display his improved lyricism, vocal delivery and choice in beats, saying, "[T]hese days everyone likes to think that every respectable artist has one "classic" in their catalogue. If that is the case, Second Round's On Me will likely go down as Obie's." Brendan Frederick of XXL praised Trice and Eminem for having "superb attention to visual details and calculated rhyme structure" and an "expanded production palate" throughout the album to deliver in telling "bleak oratories of Detroit's streets" but also highlighted Rotem's contributions on "Mama" and "Obie Story" for allowing Trice to show "historical context to his struggles", concluding with: "Filled with unflinching street tales and dense lyrical couplets, Second Round should be sipped slowly for full potency. No shots to the head necessary." Thomas Golianopoulos of Vibe praised Eminem for supplying Trice's "sinister outlook" with "equally gloomy production" on tracks like "Violent" and "The Ballad of Obie", but highlighted "Mama" for showcasing Trice with "a much sunnier disposition." A writer for AllMusic said: "Leaning heavily on a mid-paced, paranoid gangsta rap production style, evidenced on tracks like "They Wanna Kill Me" and "Snitch" (a duet with Akon), Trice stakes his claim as a tough, swaggering performer whose self-awareness never undermines his hard, ghetto edge."

Entertainment Weekly writer Gilbert Cruz gave the album a C grade, calling it "a more subdued affair" than Trice's debut because it lacked Timbaland and Dr. Dre's "jaunty beats" and with more "repetitive, simplistic production" from Eminem, concluding that "Second Round's on Me does have moments of cross-genre joy, but this round goes down like a cheap well drink." Peter Relic of Rolling Stone wrote: "Full of creepy, minor-key themes and powered by homicidal mania, Second Round is wholly lacking in the playfulness that made his debut, Cheers, a varied delight." PopMatters contributor Mike Joseph gave credit to Trice for having a "solid" flow, but criticized the "tired, predictable subject matter" throughout the track listing and Eminem's production feeling "agonizingly predictable" and "substandard" to distract listeners from the hate-filled material, concluding that: "Second Round's on Me just emphasizes everything that's wrong with gangsta rap, which started out as admirable street reporting and has regressed into wanton violence which should be viewed as a cartoon, but a generation of urban youth has unfortunately come to accept as gospel."

Track listing

Notes
 signifies an additional producer.
 signifies a co-producer.

Sample credits
"Cry Now" - "Blind Man" as performed by Bobby Blue Band.
"Wanna Know" - "It Couldn't Be Me" as performed by Power Of Zeus.

Chart positions

Album chart positions

Miscellaneous
The track "Wanna Know" was used for a Science Channel commercial, in episode 5 of Friday Night Lights and the video game Fight Night Round 3.

Album Singles

References

External links
 Track listing & producer info on Dubcc
 Snitch Video on Yahoo Music

2006 albums
Obie Trice albums
Shady Records albums
Albums produced by 9th Wonder
Albums produced by Akon
Albums produced by Emile Haynie
Albums produced by Eminem
Albums produced by J. R. Rotem